"Janie Baker's Love Slave" is a song written by Dennis Linde, and recorded by American country music band Shenandoah.  It was released in May 1993 as the lead single from their album Under the Kudzu.  The song reached a peak of number 15 on the U.S. Billboard Hot Country Singles & Tracks.

Content
The song is an uptempo, in which the narrator states that he will do anything for a girl named Janie and cannot help himself.

Music video
The music video was directed by Roger Pistole and premiered in mid-1993.

Chart performance
"Janie Baker's Love Slave" debuted at number 70 on the U.S. Billboard Hot Country Singles & Tracks for the week of June 5, 1993.

Year-end charts

References

1993 singles
1993 songs
Shenandoah (band) songs
Songs written by Dennis Linde
Song recordings produced by Don Cook
RCA Records singles